Derrick J. Lente is an American politician, attorney, and businessman serving as a member of the New Mexico House of Representatives. Elected in 2017, Lente represents the 65th district.

Early life and education 
Born and raised on the Sandia Pueblo reservation, Lente attended public schools in Bernalillo County. After taking courses at Central New Mexico Community College, Lente earned a Bachelor of Arts degree in intercultural communications and English from the University of New Mexico. He then earned a Juris Doctor from the University of New Mexico School of Law.

Career 
After graduating from law school, Lente purchased an employment agency with offices in New Mexico and California. The business grew to become one of the largest solely-owned Native American corporations in the United States. Lente sold the business in 2013.

Lente defeated 30-year-incumbent James Madalena in the 2016 Democratic primary, and took office in January 2017. Lente appeared at the 2020 Democratic National Convention to announce the votes of New Mexico's delegates.

References 

Democratic Party members of the New Mexico House of Representatives
University of New Mexico alumni
University of New Mexico School of Law alumni
Year of birth missing (living people)
Living people
21st-century American politicians